Rafael Nadal defeated Ivan Ljubičić in the final, 3–6, 2–6, 6–3, 6–4, 7–6(7–3) to win the singles tennis title at the 2005 Madrid Open. As of 2022, this remains his sole indoor hardcourt title.

Marat Safin was the reigning champion, but chose not to compete.

Seeds
A champion seed is indicated in bold text while text in italics indicates the round in which that seed was eliminated. All sixteen seeds received a bye into the second round.

Draw

Finals

Top half

Section 1

Section 2

Bottom half

Section 3

Section 4

Qualifying

Seeds

Qualifiers

Qualifying draw

First qualifier

Second qualifier

Third qualifier

Fourth qualifier

Fifth qualifier

Sixth qualifier

References

External Links
 2005 Mutua Madrilena Masters Madrid Draw

Singles